Flam or FLAM may refer to:

Flåm, a village in Norway
African Liberation Forces of Mauritania (FLAM), a paramilitary organization
Flam (surname), a list of people with the surname
Flam, a type of drum rudiment

See also
 Flåm Line, a railway line
 Flim-flam (disambiguation)
 Flan (disambiguation)